Saptha angustistriata is a moth in the family Choreutidae. It was described by Syuti Issiki in 1930. It is found in Taiwan.

References

Choreutidae
Moths described in 1930